Erich Romauch (18 July 1939 – 23 September 2020) was an Austrian ice hockey player. He competed in the men's tournament at the 1964 Winter Olympics.

References

External links
 

1939 births
2020 deaths
Austrian ice hockey players
Ice hockey players at the 1964 Winter Olympics
Olympic ice hockey players of Austria
Sportspeople from Klagenfurt
20th-century Austrian people